Bianchi may refer to:

Places 
Bianchi, Calabria, a comune in the Province of Cosenza, Italy

Manufacturing 
Bianchi Bicycles (F.I.V. Edoardo Bianchi S.p.A.), an Italian manufacturer of bicycles, and former manufacturer of motorcycles and automobiles
Bianchi (motorcycles), a line of Italian motorcycles made from 1897 to 1967
Autobianchi, an automobile manufacturer co-founded in 1955 by Fiat, Bianchi and Pirelli, before being fully bought by Fiat in 1969.
Bianchi International a leather product manufacturer based in California

Sport 
Liquigas-Bianchi, a cycling team created from the merger of Team Bianchi and Liquigas
Team Bianchi, a cycling team
The Bianchi Cup, an NRA Action Pistol Championships
Bianchi (cycling team), an Italian professional cycling team that was sponsored by and cycled on Bianchi Bicycles, 1899-2003

Mathematics 
The Bianchi identities in differential geometry,
The contracted Bianchi identities in general relativity,
The Bianchi classification of 3D Lie algebras,
The Bianchi group, the projective special group of a ring of integers.

Other uses 
Bianchi (surname)
Bianchi, another name for urinal in Asian countries.
The Bianchi battuti or White Penitents, a flagellant movement of the 15th century